Luca Miniero (born 17 January 1967) is an Italian director and screenwriter.

Life and career 
Born in Naples, after graduating in Letters Miniero moved to Milan where he started working as a director of commercial shorts. In 1998 he started collaborating with Paolo Genovese co-writing and co-directing the short film La scoperta di Walter; the duo made their feature film debut in 2002, with the critical acclaimed comedy film A Neapolitan Spell.

Miniero made his solo-directing debut in 2010, directing the box office hit Benvenuti al Sud.

Filmography 
 A Neapolitan Spell (2002, co-directed with Paolo Genovese)
 Sorry, You Can't Get Through! (2005, co-directed with Paolo Genovese)
 Viaggio in Italia - Una favola vera (2007, co-directed with Paolo Genovese) – TV film
 This Night Is Still Ours (2008, co-directed with Paolo Genovese) 
 Benvenuti al Sud (2010)
 Benvenuti al Nord (2012)
 A Boss in the Living Room (2014) 
 La scuola più bella del mondo (2014)
 Non c'è più religione (2016)
 I'm Back (2018)
 Beware the Gorilla (2019)
 Cops - Una banda di poliziotti – TV series (2020-2021)
 Le indagini di Lolita Lobosco – TV series (2021-ongoing)
 Tutti a bordo (2022)

References

External links 
 

1967 births
Living people
Italian film directors
Italian screenwriters
Italian male screenwriters
Film people from Naples
20th-century Italian people